Lloyd James  (born 26 October 1947), better known as Prince Jammy or King Jammy, is a Jamaican dub mixer and record producer. He began his musical career as a dub master at King Tubby's recording studio. His dubs are known for their clear sound and use of effects.

Biography
After earning money from building amplifiers and repairing electrical equipment from his mother's house in Waterhouse in the late 1960s, he started his own sound system.  He also built equipment for other local systems.  After leaving Jamaica to work in Canada for a few years in the early 1970s, he returned to Kingston in 1976 and set up his own studio at his in-laws' home in Waterhouse, and released a couple of Yabby You productions. When Phillip Smart left King Tubby's team to work in New York City, Jammy replaced him, getting to work with Bunny Lee and Yabby You.

In the late 1970s he began to release his own productions, including the debut album from Black Uhuru in 1977. In the 1980s, he became one of the most influential producers of dancehall music. His biggest hit was 1985's "Under Me Sleng Teng" by Wayne Smith, with an entirely-digital rhythm hook. Many credit this song as being the first "digital rhythm" in reggae, leading to the modern dancehall era. Later into 1980s, Jammy improvised Reggae and Dancehall, he digitalized old riddims, like Real Rock, and Far East. King Jammy then began working with top artists in Jamaica throughout the 1980s and 1990s such as Admiral Bailey, Admiral Tibet, Chaka Demus, Frankie Paul, Lieutenant Stitchie, Pinchers, and even Dennis Brown. Jammy's productions and sound system dominated reggae music for the remainder of the 1980s and into the 1990s. He continues to work as a producer, working with some of today's top Jamaican artists, including Sizzla.

Partial discography

Solo records or records with co-billing

Compilations
Dub Gone 2 Crazy (King Tubby & Prince Jammy – 1975–79)
Dub The Old Fashioned Way (Lee Perry & Prince Jammy – 197?)
Dubwise Revolution (King Tubby & Prince Jammy & Scientist – 197?)
The Rhythm King (Prince Jammy & Various Artists – 198?)
Umoja – 20th Century DEBwise (Dennis Brown Presents Prince Jammy – 1978)

Appearances on various artist compilations
Big Showdown
Round 2
Round 4
Round 6
Round 8
Round 10
Black Black Minds
Peace And Rest Version
How Long Version
Keep On Trying Version
 Bunny Lee Meets King Tubby & Aggrovators
Channel One A Boy
Creation Rockers
You're No Good
Don Letts Presents The Mighty Trojan Sound
 Out Of Order
Dub Chill Out
Slow Motion Dub
Black And White Dub
Dub It In The Dancehall Dub
Jump Song Dub
Dub Massive Chapter 1
Out Of Order
Fist Of Fury
Dub Massive Chapter 2
Throne Of Blood
Shaolin Temple
Dub Sessions
Dub Investigation
Brothers Of The Blade
Dubwise & Otherwise
Wreck Up A Version
Fat Man Dub Contest
Jammy A No Fool
Jammy's On The Move
Jammy's A Shine
Jammy's A Satta
Fatman Presents Twin Spin Vol I
Second Generation
First, Second And Third Generation Of Dub
Second Generation
On The Scene
Flashing Echo
Fist Of Fury
Jammin For Survival
Out Of Order Dub
Haul & Pull Up Selecta
You're No Good (12")
Jammin' For Survival (12")
Heavyweight Sound
Problems Dub
In Fine Style
A Useful Version
King Jammy In Roots
Slaughterhouse Five
Born Free (Extended Mix)
Youth Man Dub
Kung Fu !
Shaolin Temple
Throne Of Blood
Fist Of Fury
Punky Reggae Party
Run It Red
Chapter Of Money
Dub Ites Green & Gold
Higher Ranking
A Stalawatt Version
Mr. Bassie Dub
Music Dub
Scratchy Sounds
Brothers of the Blade
Straight To I Roy Head
Channel One A Boy
The Crowning Of Prince Jammy
Life Is A Moment In Space
The Crowning Of Prince Jammy
Return Of Jammy's Hi-Fi
The Rough Guide to Dub
Chapter of Money
The Trojan Story Vol 1&2
Throne of Blood
Third World Disco Vol 1
 Love Can Conquer
This Is Crucial Reggae Dub
Throne of Blood
Trojan 12" Box Set
You're No Good
Born Free
Trojan Dub Box Set Volume 2
Fist of Fury
Throne of Blood
Shaolin Temple
Under Me Sleng Teng Extravaganza
Sweet Teng
X-Ray Music
Step It Up in Dub
Dub There
The Champion Version
Dub Is My Occupation

Albums produced
Anthony Johnson – A Yah We Deh (1985)
Barry Brown – King Jammy Presents Barry Brown (1980)
Barry Brown – Showcase (1980)
Black Crucial – Mr. Sonny (1985)
Black Sounds Uhro – Love Crisis (1977)
Black Uhuru – Black Sounds of Freedom (1981)
Black Uhuru & Prince Jammy – Uhuru in Dub (1982)
Cocoa Tea – The Marshall (1985)
Dennis Brown – History (1985)
Dennis Brown – Slow Down (1985)
Errol Holt – Vision of Africa (1978)
Frankie Paul – Sara (1987)
Frankie Paul & Michael Palmer – Double Trouble (1985)
Half Pint – Money Man Skank (1984)
Half Pint – One in a Million (1984)
Kruxial Selecta- Long inna Time (1986)
Horace Andy – Haul And Jack Up (1987)
Hortense Ellis – Reflections (1979)
Hugh Mundell Featuring Lacksley Castell – Jah Fire (1980)
Johnny Osbourne – Folly Ranking (1980)
Johnny Osbourne – Mr Body Bye (198?)
Johnny Osbourne – Musical Chopper (1983)
Johnny Osbourne – Water Pumping (1983)
Jolly Brothers – Consciousness (1979)
Junior Reid – Boom Shack A Lack (1985)
King Tubby & Prince Jammy & Scientist – Dubwise Revolution (197?)
Leroy Smart – She Just A Draw Card (1982)
Leroy Smart – Showcase (1985)
Leroy Smart – We Rule Everytime (1985)
Little John – Clarks Booty (1985)
Michael Palmer – I'm So Attractive (1985)
Natural Vibes – Life Hard A Yard (1982)
Niccademos – Dance Hall Style (1982)
Noel Phillips – Youth Man Vibrations (1981)
Peter Yellow – Hot (1982)
Prince Jammy – Kamikazi Dub (1979)
Prince Jammy – Osbourne in Dub (1983)
Prince Jammy – Prince Jammy Destroys The Invaders (1982)
Prince Jammy – Strictly Dub (1981)
Prince Jammy & Various Artists – The Rhythm King (198?)
Sugar Minott – A Touch of Class (1985)
Sugar Minott – Bitter Sweet (1979)
Tonto Irie – Jammy's Possee (198?)
Travellers – Black Black Minds (1977)
U Black – Westbound Thing A Swing (1977)
U Brown – Mr Brown Something (1978)
U Brown vs Peter Yellow – DJ Confrontation (1982)
Various Artists – 10 To 1 (1985)
Various Artists – 1985 Master Mega Hits (1985)
Various Artists – 1985 Master Mega Hits Vol 2 (1985)
Various Artists – King Jammy – A Man And His Music Vol 1 (197?–8?)
Various Artists – King Jammy – A Man And His Music Vol 2 (198?)
Various Artists – King Jammy – A Man And His Music Vol 3 (198?)
Various Artists – King Jammy in Roots (197?–8?)
Various Artists – King Jammy's at Channel 1 (1977–79)
Various Artists – Prince Jammy Presents Vol 1 (1986)
Various Artists – Superstar Hit Parade (1986)
Various Artists – Under Me Sleng Teng Extravaganza (1985)
Wayne Smith – Smoker Super (1985)
Wayne Smith – Under Me Sleg Teng (1985)
Wayne Smith – Youthman Skanking (1982)
Ween – Friends EP (only track No. 4 "King Billy")

Albums engineered and/or mixed
 Agrovators – Kaya Dub (19770
 Alton Ellis – Many Moods of Alton Ellis (1978–80)
 Alton Ellis & Heptones – Alton Ellis Sings, Heptones Harmonise (1978–80)
 Augustus Pablo – El Rocker's (1972–75)
 Augustus Pablo – Rockers Meets King Tubby in a Fire House (1980)
 Augustus Pablo – Original Rockers (1972–75)
 Barrington Levy – Englishman (1979)
 Barrington Levy – Englishman – Robin Hood (1979–80)
 Barry Brown – King Jammy Presents Barry Brown (1980)
 Barry Brown – The Best of Barry Brown (197?)
 Barry Brown Meets Cornell Campbell – Barry Brown Meets Cornell Campbell (197?)
 Bim Sherman – Ghetto Dub (1988)
 Bim Sherman Meets Horace Andy And U Black – In A Rub A Dub Style (1982)
 Black Sounds Uhro – Love Crisis (1977)
 Black Uhuru – Black Sounds of Freedom (1981)
 Black Uhuru & Prince Jammy – Uhuru in Dub (1982)
 Carl Harvey – Ecstasy of Mankind (1978)
 Carlton Patterson & King Tubby – Psalms of Drums (197?)
 Cornell Campbell – Boxing (1982)
 Cornell Campbell – Follow Instructions (1983)
 Cornell Campbell – Turn Back The Hands of Time (1977)
 Creation Rebel – Close Encounters of the Third World (1978)
 Crucial Bunny Vs Prince Jammy – Fat Man Dub Contest (1979)
 DEB Music Players – 20th Century DEB-Wise (1978)
 David Jahson – Natty Chase The Barber (1978)
 Delroy Wilson – Go Away Dream (1982)
 Dennis Brown – Slow Down (1985)
 Dennis Brown Presents Prince Jammy – Umoja – 20th Century DEBwise (1978)
 Dillinger – Cornbread (1978)
 Earl "Chinna" Smith – Sticky Fingers (1977)
 Eek A Mouse – Wa Do Dem (1981)
 Frankie Paul & Michael Palmer – Double Trouble (1985)
 Gregory Isaacs – Slum in Dub (1978)
 Half Pint – One in a Million (1984)
 Horace Andy – In The Light / In The Light Dub (1977)
 Hortense Ellis – Jamaica's First Lady of Songs (1977)
 Hugh Mundell Featuring Lacksley Castell – Jah Fire (1980)
 I Roy – Can't Conquer Rasta (1976)
 Jah Frankie Jones – Satta An Praise Jah (1977)
 Jah Lloyd – Black Moses (1979)
 Jah Stitch – Original Ragga Muffin (1975–77)
 Johnny Clarke – Don't Stay Out Late (1977)
 Johnny Clarke – Dread Natty Congo (1977)
 Johnny Clarke – Sweet Conversation (1977)
 Johnny Osbourne – Folly Ranking (1980)
 Johnny Osbourne – Musical Chopper (1983)
 Johnny Osbourne – Water Pumping (1983)
 Junior Reid – Boom Shack A Lack (1985)
 Keith Hudson – Rasta Communication (1978)
 King Tubby – Dub Gone Crazy (1975–79)
 King Tubby – Dub Like Dirt (1975–77)
 King Tubby – Majestic Dub (197?)
 King Tubby's and the Agrovators – Dubbing in the Back Yard (1982)
 King Tubby & Aggrovators – Shalom Dub (1975)
 King Tubby & Prince Jammy – Dub Gone 2 Crazy (1975–79)
 King Tubby & Prince Jammy & Scientist – First, Second And Third Generation of Dub (1981)
 Leroy Smart – Reggae Showcase Vol 1 (197?)
 Leroy Smart – Superstar (1977)
 Leroy Smart – Superstar (1976)
 Linval Thompson & Wayne Jarrett & Ranking Trevor – Train To Zion Dub (1981)
 Lord Sassafrass – Horse Man Connection (1982)
 Michael Prophet – Serious Reasoning (1980)
 Mikey Dread – African Anthem (1979)
 Mikey Dread – Dread at the Controls (1979)
 Mother Liza With Kojak – Chant Down Babylon (198?)
 Noel Phillips – Youth Man Vibrations (1981)
 Paragons – Heaven & Earth (197?)
 Paragons – Now (1982)
 Pat Kelly – One Man Stand (1979)
 Peter Yellow – Hot (1982)
 Prince Far I – Cry Tuff Dub Encounter II (1979)
 Prince Hammer – World War Dub Part 1 (1979)
 Prince Jammy – Dub Culture (1983]
 Prince Jammy – Fatman vrs. Shaka in a Dub Conference (1980)
 Prince Jammy – Kamikazi Dub (1979)
 Prince Jammy – Prince Jammy Destroys The Invaders (1982)
 Prince Jammy – Strictly Dub (1981)
 Revolutionaries – Goldmine Dub (1979)
 Rockers All Stars – Chanting Dub with the Help of the Father (1978)
 Rod Taylor – Ethiopians Kings (1975–80)
 Scientist – Heavy Metal Dub (1982)
 Scientist & Jammy – Scientist & Jammy Strike Back (1983)
 Scientist & Prince Jammie – Dub Landing Vol: 2 (1982)
 Sly & Robbie – Raiders Of The Lost Dub (1981)
 Sly And The Revolutionaries With Jah Thomas – Black Ash Dub (1980)
 Sugar Minott – Bitter Sweet (1979)
 Sugar Minott – Black Roots (1980)
 Sugar Minott – Ghetto-ology (1979)
 Tappa Zukie – Escape From Hell (1977)
 Tappa Zukie – Tapper Roots (1978)
 The Agrovators – Jammies In Lion Dub Style (1978)
 The Rass-es Band & Prince Jammy – Harder Na Rass (1979)
 Tommy McCook – Blazing Horns – Tenor In Roots (1976–78)
 Tommy McCook & Bobby Ellis – Blazing Horns (1977)
 Travellers – Black Black Minds (1977)
 Trinity – Dreadlocks Satisfaction (1978)
 U Brown – Mr Brown Something (1978)
 Uniques – Showcase (1978)
 Various Artists – Superstar Hit Parade (1986)
 Wayne Smith – Smoker Super (1985)
 Wayne Smith – Youthman Skanking (1982)
Ween – Friends EP (only track #4 "King Billy")
 Yabby U – Jah Jah Way (1980)
 Yabby You – Beware (1978)
 Yabby You – Dub It To The Top (1976–79)
 Yabby You & Various Artists – Jesus Dread (1972–77)

As an arranger
 Black Crucial – Mr. Sonny (1985)
 Black Sounds Uhro – Love Crisis (1977)
 Dennis Brown – History (1985)
 Dennis Brown – Slow Down (1985)
 Johnny Osbourne – Folly Ranking (1980)
 Noel Phillips – Youth Man Vibrations (1981)
 The Agrovators – Jammies In Lion Dub Style (1978)

As a percussionist
 Dennis Brown – Slow Down (1985)
 Johnny Osbourne – Water Pumping (1983)

Bibliography

References

External links
 Interview part 1 9 April 2007 on BBC Radio 1Xtra; 60 minutes. (RealPlayer)
 Interview part 2 9 April 2007 on BBC Radio 1Xtra; 27 minutes. (RealPlayer)
 Tunes produced by King Jammy
Discography at Discogs

1947 births
Jamaican dancehall musicians
Dub musicians
Ragga musicians
Jamaican record producers
Jamaican reggae musicians
People from Montego Bay
Living people
VP Records artists
Greensleeves Records artists